Rudno  is a village in the administrative district of Gmina Pelplin, within Tczew County, Pomeranian Voivodeship, in northern Poland. It is located within the ethnocultural region of Kociewie in the historic region of Pomerania.

The village has a population of 935.

Rudno was a royal village of the Polish Crown, administratively located in the Tczew County in the Pomeranian Voivodeship.

During the occupation of Poland (World War II), in 1939, the Germans murdered the local Polish teacher and his wife along with several Poles from other villages in the Szpęgawski Forest (see Intelligenzaktion Pommern).

References

Rudno